Medak district is a district located in the Indian state of Telangana. Medak is the district headquarters. The district shares boundaries with Sangareddy, Kamareddy, Siddipet and Medchal districts.

History 

Traces of Neolithic and Megalithic culture was found at Edithanur and Wargal village hillocks in the district. Rock paintings were found at Edithanur boulders and Hastallapur rocks.

Nizam state 
In 20th century Medak district was a part of Nizam princely State before independence and merged into Hyderabad State in Independent India and presently a district of Telangana. Qutub Shahis named it as Gulshanabad which means '"city of gardens'" due to its luscious greenery.

Geography 

Economy 
In 2006 the Indian government named Medak one of the country's 250 most backward districts (out of a total of 640). It is one of the thirteen districts in Andhra Pradesh currently receiving funds from the Backward Regions Grant Fund Programme (BRGF).

Demographics 

As of the 2011 Census of India, the district has a population of 767,428.

Administrative divisions 

The district is divided into three revenue divisions of Medak, Narsapur and Tupran. These are sub-divided into 20 revenue mandals (15 Mandal Praja Parishads) and has 381 villages constituting 320 gram panchayats.  Sri Dr. S. Harish is the present collector of the district.

Mandals 

The below table categorizes 20 mandals into their respective revenue divisions in the district:

References

External links 

 Official website

 
Districts of Telangana